Sarah Elizabeth Curtis,  is a British geographer and academic, specialising in health geography. From 2006 to 2016, she was Professor of Health and Risk at Durham University; she is now professor emeritus. A graduate of St Hilda's College, Oxford, she was Director of the Institute of Hazard Risk and Resilience at Durham between 2012 and 2016. She previously researched and taught at the University of Kent and at Queen Mary, University of London.

Honours
In 2014, Curtis was elected a Fellow of the British Academy (FBA), the United Kingdom's national academy for the humanities and social sciences. She is also a Fellow of the Academy of Social Sciences (FAcSS), and a Fellow of the Royal Geographical Society (FRGS).

Selected works

References

Living people
British geographers
Women geographers
20th-century geographers
21st-century geographers
Academics of Durham University
Academics of the University of Kent
Academics of Queen Mary University of London
Academics of the University of London
Alumni of St Hilda's College, Oxford
Fellows of the British Academy
Fellows of the Royal Geographical Society
Fellows of the Academy of Social Sciences
Human geographers
Year of birth missing (living people)
English geographers
21st-century English women
British women social scientists
British social scientists
20th-century English educators
21st-century English educators